The Italian general election of 1996 took place on 21 April 1996. In Veneto the election was narrowly won by the centre-left Olive Tree coalition, which won also nationally, but Liga Veneta–Lega Nord was the most voted party in the region: 32.8% in single-seat constituencies and 29.3% among party lists.

Results

Chamber of Deputies

|- bgcolor="#E9E9E9"
!style="background-color:#E9E9E9" align=left rowspan=2 valign=bottom|Coalition
!colspan="3" align="center" valign=top|Single-seat constituencies
!colspan="5" align="center" valign=top|Proportional system
!colspan="1" align="center" valign=top|Total
|-
|- bgcolor="#E9E9E9"
|align="center" valign=top|votes
|align="center" valign=top|votes (%)
|align="center" valign=top|seats
|align="center" valign=top|Party
|align="center" valign=top|votes
|align="center" valign=top|votes (%)
|align="center" valign=top|seats
|align="center" valign=top|tot.
|align="center" valign=top|seats

|-
|rowspan="5" align="left" valign=top|The Olive Tree–Progressives–LAV
|rowspan="5" align="right" valign=top|1,061,861
|rowspan="5" align="right" valign=top|33.8
|rowspan="5" align="right" valign=top|15

|rowspan="1" align="left"|Democratic Party of the Left
|align="right"|374,836
|align="right"|11.8
|align="right"|1

|rowspan="5" align="right" valign=top|4
|rowspan="5" align="right" valign=top|19

|-

|rowspan="1" align="left"|Italian People's Party-UD-PRI-SVP-Prodi
|align="right"|257,552
|align="right"|8.1
|align="right"|1

|-

|rowspan="1" align="left"|Communist Refoundation Party
|align="right"|166,793
|align="right"|5.3
|align="right"|1

|-

|rowspan="1" align="left"|Italian Renewal-Socialists-Patto
|align="right"|165,675
|align="right"|5.2
|align="right"|1

|-

|rowspan="1" align="left"|Federation of the Greens
|align="right"|79,394
|align="right"|2.5
|align="right"|-

|-
|rowspan="1" align="left"|Lega Nord
|rowspan="1" align="right"|1,031,223
|rowspan="1" align="right"|32.8
|rowspan="1" align="right"|15

|rowspan="1" align="left"|Lega Nord
|align="right"|928,033
|align="right"|29.3
|align="right"|4

|rowspan="1" align="right"|4
|rowspan="1" align="right"|19

|-
|rowspan="4" align="left" valign=top|Pole of Freedoms
|rowspan="4" align="right" valign=top|1,015,697
|rowspan="4" align="right" valign=top|32.3
|rowspan="4" align="right" valign=top|7

|rowspan="1" align="left"|Forza Italia
|align="right"|542,488
|align="right"|17.1
|align="right"|2

|rowspan="4" align="right" valign=top|5
|rowspan="4" align="right" valign=top|12

|-

|rowspan="1" align="left"|National Alliance
|align="right"|371,207
|align="right"|11.7
|align="right"|2

|-

|rowspan="1" align="left"|CCD-CDU
|align="right"|171,711
|align="right"|5.4
|align="right"|1

|-

|rowspan="1" align="left"|Pannella–Sgarbi List
|align="right"|29,942
|align="right"|1.0
|align="right"|-

|-
|rowspan="1" align="left"|North-East Union
|rowspan="1" align="right"|9,996
|rowspan="1" align="right"|0.3
|rowspan="1" align="right"|-

|rowspan="1" align="left"|North-East Union
|align="right"|63,934
|align="right"|2.0
|align="right"|-

|rowspan="1" align="right"|-
|rowspan="1" align="right"|-

|-
|rowspan="1" align="left"|Tricolour Flame
|rowspan="1" align="right"|4,459
|rowspan="1" align="right"|0.1
|rowspan="1" align="right"|-

|rowspan="1" align="left"|Tricolour Flame
|align="right"|9,780
|align="right"|0.3
|align="right"|-

|rowspan="1" align="right"|-
|rowspan="1" align="right"|-

|-
|rowspan="1" align="left"|Others
|rowspan="1" align="right"|20,302
|rowspan="1" align="right"|0.6
|rowspan="1" align="right"|-

|rowspan="1" align="left"|others
|align="right"|9,490
|align="right"|0.3
|align="right"|-

|rowspan="1" align="right"|-
|rowspan="1" align="right"|-

|-
|- bgcolor="#E9E9E9"
!rowspan="1" align="left" valign="top"|Total coalitions
!rowspan="1" align="right" valign="top"|3,141,181
!rowspan="1" align="right" valign="top"|100.0
!rowspan="1" align="right" valign="top"|37
!rowspan="1" align="left" valign="top"|Total parties
!rowspan="1" align="right" valign="top"|3,170,835
!rowspan="1" align="right" valign="top"|100.0
!rowspan="1" align="right" valign="top"|13
!rowspan="1" align="right" valign="top"|13
!rowspan="1" align="right" valign="top"|50
|}Source: Regional Council of Veneto

Provincial breakdown
Source: Regional Council of Veneto

Senate

|- bgcolor="#E9E9E9"
!style="background-color:#E9E9E9" align=left rowspan=2 valign=bottom|Coalition
!colspan="3" align="center" valign=top|Single-seat constituencies
!colspan="1" align="center" valign=top|PR
!colspan="1" align="center" valign=top|Total
|-
|- bgcolor="#E9E9E9"
|align="center" valign=top|votes
|align="center" valign=top|votes (%)
|align="center" valign=top|seats
|align="center" valign=top|seats
|align="center" valign=top|seats
|-
|rowspan="1" align="left" valign=top|The Olive Tree–Progressives–LAV
|rowspan="1" align="right" valign=top|938,606
|rowspan="1" align="right" valign=top|33.9
|rowspan="1" align="right" valign=top|8
|rowspan="1" align="right" valign=top|2
|rowspan="1" align="right" valign=top|10
|-
|rowspan="1" align="left" valign=top|Pole of Freedoms
|rowspan="1" align="right" valign=top|840,404
|rowspan="1" align="right" valign=top|30.4
|rowspan="1" align="right" valign=top|1
|rowspan="1" align="right" valign=top|3
|rowspan="1" align="right" valign=top|4
|-
|rowspan="1" align="left"|Lega Nord
|rowspan="1" align="right" valign=top|839,339
|rowspan="1" align="right" valign=top|30.3
|rowspan="1" align="right" valign=top|8
|rowspan="1" align="right" valign=top|1
|rowspan="1" align="right" valign=top|9
|-
|rowspan="1" align="left"|North-East Union
|rowspan="1" align="right" valign=top|72,541
|rowspan="1" align="right" valign=top|2.6
|rowspan="1" align="right" valign=top|-
|rowspan="1" align="right" valign=top|-
|rowspan="1" align="right" valign=top|-
|-
|rowspan="1" align="left"|Tricolour Flame
|rowspan="1" align="right" valign=top|39,096
|rowspan="1" align="right" valign=top|1.4
|rowspan="1" align="right" valign=top|-
|rowspan="1" align="right" valign=top|-
|rowspan="1" align="right" valign=top|-
|-
|rowspan="1" align="left"|Others
|rowspan="1" align="right" valign=top|38,257
|rowspan="1" align="right" valign=top|1.4
|rowspan="1" align="right" valign=top|-
|rowspan="1" align="right" valign=top|-
|rowspan="1" align="right" valign=top|-
|-
|- bgcolor="#E9E9E9"
!rowspan="1" align="left" valign="top"|Total coalitions
!rowspan="1" align="right" valign="top"|2,768,243
!rowspan="1" align="right" valign="top"|100.0
!rowspan="1" align="right" valign="top"|17
!rowspan="1" align="right" valign="top"|6
!rowspan="1" align="right" valign="top"|23
|}Source: Regional Council of Veneto

Elections in Veneto
General, Veneto